A) is a French ham sandwich made of a fresh baguette sliced open, spread with salty butter, and filled with slices of ham.

Each day in France, over 3 million jambon-beurre sandwiches are sold, more than almost any other kind of sandwich, except for fast-food hamburgers.

See also
 List of French dishes
 List of ham dishes
 List of sandwiches

References 

French sandwiches
French cuisine
Ham dishes
Pork sandwiches